Click! is a series of erotic Italian comic books written and illustrated by comic book creator Milo Manara. It was first published in 1983 as Il gioco in the Italian Playmen and as Déclic in L'Écho des savanes in France. Three sequels have followed, in 1991, 1994 and 2001.

Synopsis
The first volume features an attractive but passionless woman, Ms. Claudia Cristiani, who is married to an older, rich man. After she is abducted by a scientist and a remote-controlled device is surgically implanted into her brain, its activation makes her become sexually insatiable. The three sequels roughly follow a similar story.

Adaptations
Il gioco was the basis for the 1985 French film, Le déclic.

References

External links 
 Il gioco/Click 
 

1983 comics debuts
2001 comics endings
Erotic comics
Italian comics titles
Italian comics adapted into films
Comics adapted into television series